Gōshō-ji is the name of numerous Buddhist temples in Japan, and may refer to:

　in Utazu, Kagawa Prefecture, temple No. 78 in the Shikoku Pilgrimage
　in Takarazuka, Hyōgo Prefecture